Mycena amicta, commonly known as the coldfoot bonnet, is a species of mushroom in the family Mycenaceae. It was first described in 1821 by mycologist Elias Magnus Fries.

Description
Fresh specimens appear unmistakably blue; this fades to brownish hues in age.

The cap cuticle can be peeled. The gills are close and the stipe is covered in powdery hairs.

The mushrooms appear in small groups, on the trunks of broadleaved trees, and particularly in the Pacific Northwest, around rotted conifer wood.

References

amicta
Fungi described in 1821
Fungi of Europe